Almir Pliska (born 12 August 1987) is a Bosnian-Herzegovinian former professional footballer who played as a forward.

Career
Pliska was, together with Asim Škaljić, snapped up by Olimpik Sarajevo in December 2010 He played in Serbian First League with Moravac Mrštane.

References

External links
 
 

1987 births
Living people
Footballers from Sarajevo
Association football forwards
Bosnia and Herzegovina footballers
FK Sarajevo players
FK Olimpik players
FK Velež Mostar players
NK Travnik players
FK Partizani Tirana players
FK Goražde players
FK Moravac Mrštane players
NK Zvijezda Gradačac players
FK Slavija Sarajevo players
NK Čelik Zenica players
Premier League of Bosnia and Herzegovina players
Kategoria Superiore players
Serbian First League players
Bosnia and Herzegovina expatriate footballers
Expatriate footballers in Albania
Bosnia and Herzegovina expatriate sportspeople in Albania
Expatriate footballers in Serbia
Bosnia and Herzegovina expatriate sportspeople in Serbia
Expatriate footballers in Germany
Bosnia and Herzegovina expatriate sportspeople in Germany